Just For Fun is a Canadian children's game show television series which aired on CBC Television from 1975 to 1976.

Premise
This game show required contestants to answer quiz questions on various subjects and to perform various stunts such as spinning hula hoops, bobbing for apples or keeping brooms in balance. Just For Fun was geared towards children in seventh grade.

Scheduling
This half-hour series was broadcast Tuesdays at 5:00 p.m. (Eastern) from 16 December 1975 to 30 March 1976 in the first season, then was aired on Wednesdays at 4:30 p.m. for its second season from 15 September to 18 December 1976.

References

External links
 

CBC Television original programming
1970s Canadian game shows
1975 Canadian television series debuts
1976 Canadian television series endings